Xylota setigera is a species of hoverfly in the family Syrphidae.

Distribution
Borneo.

References

Eristalinae
Insects described in 1982
Diptera of Asia